Noravan may refer to:
 Noravan, Armavir, Armenia
 Noravan, Syunik, Armenia